Thomas Crage (19 November 1879 – 13 October 1945) was a South African cricketer. He played in four first-class matches for Eastern Province from 1903/04 to 1921/22.

See also
 List of Eastern Province representative cricketers

References

External links
 

1879 births
1945 deaths
South African cricketers
Eastern Province cricketers
Cricketers from Port Elizabeth